"Breathing Underwater" is a song by Scottish singer Emeli Sandé, recorded for her second studio album Long Live the Angels (2016). It was written by Sandé and Chris Loco, while production was helmed by Loco. The song was released as the album's second single on 28 October 2016 and became a top twenty hit on the Scottish Singles Chart. In support of its release, Sandé performed the song live on The X Factor on 6 November.

Music video
A music video for "Breathing Underwater", directed by Tim Mattia, was released on 9 November 2016.

Track listings

Credits and personnel 
Credits adapted from the liner notes of Long Live the Angels.

 Chris Loco – keyboards, percussion, production, recording
 Kieron McIntosh – upright piano
 Raf Riley – mixing

 Harriet Pope – harp
 Gavin Powell – organ
 Emeli Sandé – vocals

Charts

References

2016 singles
2016 songs
Virgin Records singles
Emeli Sandé songs
Songs written by Emeli Sandé
Songs written by Chris Loco